Lucky Benson is an American artist and filmmaker. They are best known for co-directing The Filmballad of Mamadada (2013), an experimental biopic on the artist Elsa von Freytag-Loringhoven.

Biography 
Lucky Benson was born in Philadelphia, Pennsylvania. They studied at The Cooper Union for the Advancement of Science and Art in New York City, and at Lund University (Malmö Art Academy) in Sweden.

In 2019, an exhibition of Lucky Benson's video works, curated by Katherine Behar, was displayed at the Baruch College in New York City. The exhibition, called "Lily Benson: Future Mechanism Replacement",  brought together four of their works, which aim to unsettle characters and events from the past, diverting them from expected outcomes to alternative horizons and untapped feminist futures.

Notable Films 
The Filmballad of Mamadada (2013)

A Tour of the Self Cleaning House (2015)

Because Particles (2015)

References

External links
 Website
 

Living people
1986 births
American filmmakers
Artists from Philadelphia
Lund University alumni
Cooper Union alumni